Josée Charbonneau  (born 8 June 1972) is a Canadian freestyle skier. She was born in Val-David, Quebec. She competed at the 1998 Winter Olympics, in women's moguls.

References

External links 
 

1972 births
Sportspeople from Quebec
Living people
Canadian female freestyle skiers
Olympic freestyle skiers of Canada
Freestyle skiers at the 1998 Winter Olympics
People from Laurentides